

G

 G: (2002 & 2004)
 G-Force (2009)
 G-Men from Hell (2000)
 G-SALE (2003)
 G.I. Blues (1960)
 G.I. Jane (1997)
 G.I. Joe: The Movie (1987)
 G.I. Joe: The Rise of Cobra (2009)
 G.I. Joe: Retaliation (2013)
 G.O.R.A. (2005)
 G@me (2003)
 G Men (1935)

Ga

Gaa-Gam

 Gaai Aur Gori (1973)
 Gaali (1944)
 Gaali Gopura (1962)
 Gaali Maathu (1981)
 Gaali Medalu (1962)
 Gaali Sampath (2021)
 Gaalipata (2008)
 Gaalipata 2 (2022)
 Gaana Bajaana (2010)
 Gaanam (1982)
 Gaandharvam (1978)
 Gaane Ki Aane (2016)
 Gaatho (2016)
 Gaayam (1993)
 Gaayam 2 (2010)
 Gaayathri (1977)
 Gaayathridevi Ente Amma (1985)
 Gaban (1966)
 Gabbeh (1997)
 Gabriel: (1976 & 2007)
 Gabriel Over the White House (1933)
 Gabrielle: (1954, 2005 & 2013)
 Gaby (1956)
 Gada Meilin (2002)
 Gagamboy (2004)
 Gaia (2021)
 Gainsbourg: A Heroic Life (2010)
 Galaxina (1980)
 Galaxy Invader (1985)
 The Galaxy on Earth (2014)
 Galaxy Quest (1999)
 Galaxy of Terror (1981)
 Galaxy Turnpike (2015)
 The Gallant Hours (1960)
 Gallipoli: (1981 & 2005)
 The Galloping Major (1951)
 Galloping Thunder: (1927 & 1946)
 Galveston (2018)
 Gambit: (1966, 2012 & unreleased)
 The Gamble: (1916, 1971 & 1988)
 Gambler (1971)
 The Gambler: (1919, 1938, 1958, 1974, 1995, 1997, 2013 & 2014)
 The Game: (1997 & 2010)
 Game 6 (2005)
 Game of Death (1978)
 Game of Death II (1981)
 Game Night (2018)
 Game Over: (2003 TV, 2013 & 2019)
 Game Over, Man! (2018)
 Game Over: Kasparov and the Machine (2003)
 The Game Plan (2007)
 The Game of Their Lives: (2002 & 2005)
 Gamer: (2009 & 2011)
 Gamera vs. Guiron (1969)
 Gamera vs. Gyaos (1967)
 Gamera vs. Zigra (1971)
 Gamera: Guardian of the Universe (1995)
 Gamera 2: Attack of Legion (1996)
 Gamera 3: The Revenge of Iris (1999)
 Gamers (2006)
 The Gamers (2002)

Gan-Gaz

 Ganbare! Gian!! (2001)
 Gandahar (1987)
 Gandhi (1982)
 Gandhi, My Father (2007)
 Gang in Blue (1996)
 Gang Related (1997)
 The Gang That Couldn't Shoot Straight (1971)
 Gangaajal (2003)
 Gangs of New York (2002)
 Gangs of Wasseypur (2012)
 Gangster No. 1 (2000)
 Gangster Payday (2014)
 Gangster Squad (2013)
 The Gangster, the Cop, the Devil (2019)
 Ganja and Hess (1973)
 Gantz: O (2016)
 Garage Days (2002)
 Garagouz (2010)
 Garakowa: Restore the World (2016)
 Garbo (1992)
 Garden of Eden (1954)
 The Garden of Eden: (1928, 1984, 1998 & 2008)
 The Garden of Evening Mists (2019)
 Garden of Evil (1954)
 The Garden of the Finzi-Continis (1970)
 Garden of Heaven (2003)
 Garden Party: (2008 & 2017)
 Garden State (2004)
 The Garden of Words (2013)
 The Gardener: (1912, 1974, 1987 & 2012)
 Gardens of Stone (1987)
 Garfield: The Movie (2004)
 Garfield: A Tale of Two Kitties (2006)
 Garçon stupide (2004)
 Garm Wars: The Last Druid (2014)
 The Garment Jungle (1957)
 Garōden (1995)
 Gas Food Lodging (1992)
 Gas! (1971)
 Gaslight: (1940 & 1944)
 Gasoline (2001)
 The Gate: (1987 & 2014)
 Gate of Flesh (1964)
 The Gate of Heavenly Peace (1995)
 Gate of Hell (1953)
 Gates of Heaven (1980)
 The Gathering: (1977 TV & 2002)
 A Gathering of Eagles (1963)
 Gattaca  (1997)
 The Gauntlet (1977)
 Gawain and the Green Knight (1973)
 The Gay Deceiver (1926)
 The Gay Deceivers (1969)
 The Gay Divorcee (1934)
 The Gay Falcon (1941)
 Gay Purr-ee (1962)
 Gay USA (1978)
 Gaza (2019)
 Gaza Strip (2002)
 Gazal (1964)

Ge

 Gebo and the Shadow (2012)
 Geek Charming (2011)
 GeGeGe no Nyōbō (2010)
 A Geisha (1953)
 The Geisha: (1914 & 1983)
 The Geisha Boy (1958)
 The Geisha and the Samurai (1919)
 Gekijōban Meiji Tokyo Renka: Yumihari no Serenade (2015)
 Gemeni (2002)
 Gemini: (1999, 2002 & 2017)
 Gemini Man (2019)
 Gen (2006)
 The Gene Generation (2006)
 Gene-X (2006)
 Genealogies of a Crime (1997)
 The General: (1927, 1992 & 1998)
 General della Rovere (1959)
 The General Died at Dawn (1936)
 General Idi Amin Dada: A Self Portrait (1974)
 The General Line (1929)
 General Spanky (1936)
 The General's Daughter (1999)
 A Generation (1955)
 Generation X (1996) (TV)
 Genesis: (1986, 1999, 2018 Canadian & 2018 Hungarian)
 Genesis: The Creation and the Flood (1994) (TV)
 Genevieve (1953)
 Genghis Blues (1999)
 Genghis Khan: (1950, 1965, 1998 & 2018)
 Genghis Khan: To the Ends of the Earth and Sea (2007)
 A Genius, Two Partners and a Dupe (1975)
 Genova (1953)
 Genova (2008)
 The Gentle Art of Burglary (1916)
 A Gentle Creature (2017)
 A Gentle Woman (1969)
 Gentleman: (1989, 1993 & 2016)
 The Gentleman (1994)
 Gentleman Jim (1942)
 Gentleman's Agreement (1947)
 Gentlemen (2014)
 The Gentlemen: (1965 & 2019)
 Gentlemen Broncos (2009)
 Gentlemen of Fortune (1971)
 Gentlemen Marry Brunettes (1955)
 Gentlemen Prefer Blondes: (1928 & 1953)
 Genuine (1920)
 Geographies of Solitude (2022)
 Geography Club (2013)
 Georg (2007)
 George Harrison: Living in the Material World (2011)
 George of the Jungle (1997)
 George of the Jungle 2 (2003)
 George Lopez Why You Crying? (2004)
 George Lucas in Love (1999)
 George Wallace (1997) (TV)
 George Washington (2000)
 George Washington Slept Here (1942)
 George White's 1935 Scandals (1935)
 Georgetown (2019)
 Georgia: (1988 & 1995)
 Georgia Rule (2007)
 Georgica (1998)
 Georgy Girl (1966)
 Geostorm (2017)
 Gerald McBoing-Boing (1951)
 Gerald's Game (2017)
 Geraldine's Fortune (2004)
 Geran (2019)
 Geri's Game (1997)
 Germany in Autumn (1978)
 Germany Pale Mother (1980)
 Germany, Year Zero (1948)
 Germinal: (1913, 1963 & 1993)
 Geronimo: (1939, 1962, 1993 TV & 2014)
 Geronimo's Last Raid (1912)
 Gerry: (2002 & 2011)
 Gertie the Dinosaur (1914)
 Gertrud (1964)
 Gervaise (1956)
 Gestapo's Last Orgy (1977)
 Get on the Bus (1996)
 Get Carter: (1971 & 2000)
 Get Christie Love! (1974) (TV)
 Get a Clue (2002) (TV)
 Get Crazy (1983)
 Get Duked! (2019)
 Get the Gringo (2012)
 Get Hard (2015)
 Get Him to the Greek (2010)
 Get In (2009)
 Get Low (2009)
 Get Me Roger Stone (2017)
 Get on Up (2014)
 Get Out (2017)
 Get Out of My Room (1985)
 Get Out Your Handkerchiefs (1978)
 Get Over It (2001)
 Get Real (1998)
 Get Rich or Die Tryin' (2005)
 Get Shorty (1995)
 Get Smart (2008)
 Get Up! (2003)
 Getaway (2013)
 The Getaway: (1972 & 1994)
 Gettin' Square (2003)
 Getting Any? (1995)
 Getting Away with Murder (1996)
 Getting Away with Murder: The JonBenét Ramsey Mystery (2000)
 Getting Even with Dad (1994)
 Getting Home (2007)
 Getting In (1994)
 Getting Lucky (1999)
 Getting My Brother Laid (2001)
 Getting There (2002)
 The Getting of Wisdom (1977)
 Gettysburg: (1993 & 2011 TV)
 Geulimja (1935)
 Geumbungeo (1927)

Gg

 GG Bond 2 (2014)
 GG Bond Movie: Ultimate Battle (2015)
 GG Bond: Guarding (2017)

Gh

 Ghaath: 2000, 2023 
 Ghaav: The Wound (2002)
 Ghaazee Bandaarain (1982)
 Ghadi (2013)
 Ghajini: (2005 & 2008)
 Ghana Must Go (2016)
 Ghanchakkar (2013)
 Ghani: (2006 & 2021)
 Ghar (1978)
 Ghar Basake Dekho (1963)
 Ghar Ek Mandir (1984)
 Ghar Ghar Ki Kahani: (1970 & 1988)
 Ghar Ho To Aisa (1990)
 Ghar Jamai (1992)
 Gharsallah, la semence de Dieu (2007)
 Ghetto (1997)
 Ghetto Freaks (1970)
 Ghetto Stories (2010)
 Ghidorah, the Three-Headed Monster (1965)
 Ghilli (2004)
 Ghost: (1990, 1998, 2012, 2015, 2019 & 2020)
 The Ghost: (1963, 1982, 2004, 2008 & 2010)
 A Ghost and the Boy with a Box on His Head (2017)
 The Ghost Breakers (1940)
 Ghost Brigade (1993)
 Ghost Dad (1990)
 The Ghost and the Darkness (1996)
 Ghost Dog: The Way of the Samurai (1999)
 The Ghost of Frankenstein (1942)
 The Ghost Galleon (1974)
 The Ghost Goes West (1935)
 Ghost House: (2004 & 2017)
 The Ghost Hunt (1918)
 Ghost Hunting (2017)
 The Ghost Inside (2005)
 Ghost in Love (1998)
 Ghost in the Machine (1993)
 The Ghost and Mr. Chicken (1966)
 The Ghost and Mrs. Muir (1947)
 Ghost in the Noonday Sun (1974)
 Ghost Rider: (1982 & 2007)
 The Ghost Rider: (1935 & 1943)
 Ghost Rider: Spirit of Vengeance (2011)
Ghost of Saga Mansion (1953)
 Ghost in the Shell: (1995 & 2017)
 Ghost in the Shell 2: Innocence (2004)
 The Ghost Ship (1944)
 Ghost Ship: (1952 & 2002)
 The Ghost of Sierra de Cobre (1964) (TV)
 Ghost Station (2007)
 Ghost Story: (1974 & 1981)
 A Ghost Story (2017)
 Ghost Town (2008)
 Ghost Train: (1927 & 2006)
 The Ghost Train: (1931 & 1941) 
 Ghost Train International (1976)
 Ghost Tropic (2019)
 Ghost Valley (1932)
 Ghost Valley Raiders (1940)
 The Ghost Valley's Treasure Mysteries (1974)
 A Ghost Waits (2020)
 Ghost World (2001)
 The Ghost Writer (2010)
 Ghost: Mouichido Dakishimetai (2010)
 Ghostbusters series:
 Ghostbusters: (1984 & 2016)
 Ghostbusters II (1989)
 Ghostbusters: Afterlife (2021)
 Ghostheads (2016)
 Ghostkeeper (1981)
 Ghosts: (1915, 2005, 2006 & 2014)
 Ghosts of the Abyss (2003)
 Ghosts Before Breakfast (1928)
 The Ghosts of Buxley Hall (1980) (TV)
 Ghosts Can't Do It (1990)
 Ghosts of Chosun (1970)
 Ghosts of Girlfriends Past (2009)
 Ghosts of Mars (2001)
 Ghosts of Mississippi (1996)
 Ghosts of Our Forest (2017)
 Ghosts of Rome (1961)
 Ghosts of War (2020)
 Ghosts… of the Civil Dead (1988)
 Ghostwatch (1992) (TV)
Ghoulies series:
 Ghoulies (1985)
 Ghoulies 2 (1987)
 Ghoulies III: Ghoulies Go To College (1991)
 Ghoulies IV (1994)
 Ghulam (1998)
 Ghulami (1985)
 Ghunda Raj (1994)
 Ghundi Run (2007)
 Ghunghat: (1960, 1962 & 1996)
 Ghungroo Ki Awaaz (1981)
 Ghutan (2007)

Gi-Gj

 Gia (1998)
 Giallo (2010)
 Giant (1956)
 The Giant Claw (1957)
 The Giant of Marathon (1959)
 The Giant Spider Invasion (1975)
 Giants and Toys (1958)
 Gideon's Day (1958)
 Gideon's Trumpet (1980) (TV)
 Gidget (1959)
 Gidget Goes Hawaiian (1961)
 Gidget Goes to Rome (1963)
 Gie (2005)
 Gift: (1966 & 1993)
 The Gift: (1979 TV, 1994 TV, 2000, 2003, 2014, 2015 American & 2015 Scottish)
 A Gift from Bob (2020)
 Gift of Gab (1934)
 Gigantic (2009)
 Gigantic (A Tale of Two Johns) (2002)
 Gigi: (1949 & 1958)
 Gigli (2003)
 Gigolo (1926)
 The Gigolo: (1960 & 2015)
 The Gigolo 2 (2016)
 The Gigolos (2005)
 Gigot (1962)
 Gilda (1946)
 The Gilded Lily: (1921 & 1935)
 "Giliap" (1975)
 Gimme the Loot (2012)
 Gimme Shelter (1970 & 2013)
 Ginger and Fred (1986)
 Ginger Mick (1920)
 Ginger in the Morning (1974)
 Ginger Snaps series:
 Ginger Snaps (2000)
 Ginger Snaps 2: Unleashed (2004)
 Ginger Snaps Back: The Beginning (2004)
 The Gingerbread Man (1998)
 Gingerclown (2013)
 Gintama series:
 Gintama: The Movie (2010)
 Gintama: The Movie: The Final Chapter: Be Forever Yorozuya (2013)
 Gintama (2017)
 Gintama 2: Rules are Made to be Broken (2018)
 Gintama: The Very Final (2021)
 Giovanni Falcone (1993)
 Giovanni's Island (2014)
 Giran (2009)
 The Girl: (1987, 2000, 2012 TV  & 2014)
 Girl 6 (1996)
 Girl Asleep (2015)
 The Girl in the Bathtub (2018)
 Girl on a Bicycle (2013)
 Girl on the Bridge (1999)
 The Girl Can't Help It (1956)
 Girl Crazy: (1932 & 1943)
 A Girl and a Dolphin (1979)
 The Girl with the Dragon Tattoo: (2009 & 2011)
 A Girl in Every Port: (1928 & 1952)
 Girl Friends (1936)
 Girl in Gold Boots (1969)
 The Girl of the Golden West: (1915, 1922, 1923, 1930 & 1938)
 Girl Happy (1965)
 A Girl from Hunan (1986)
 Girl Lost (2016)
 The Girl from Monday (2005)
 Girl Most Likely (2012)
 The Girl on a Motorcycle (1968)
 The Girl Next Door: (2004 & 2007)
 The Girl in the Park (2007)
 Girl with a Pearl Earring (2003)
 Girl Picture (2022)
 Girl in the Picture (2022)
 The Girl in the Picture: (1957 & 1985)
 Girl from Rio: (1939 & 2001)
 The Girl from Rio: (1927 & 1969)
 The Girl in Room 20 (1949)
 The Girl in Room 2A (1974)
 Girl Shy (1924)
 The Girl and the Spider (2021)
 The Girl in the Spider's Web (2018)
 Girl Stroke Boy (1971)
 The Girl in the Taxi: (1921 & 1937)
 Girl on the Third Floor (2019)
 The Girl on the Train: (2013 & 2016)
 A Girl Walks Home Alone at Night (2014)
 The Girl Who Believes in Miracles (2021)
 The Girl Who Kicked the Hornets' Nest (2009)
 The Girl Who Knew Too Much (1969)
 The Girl Who Leapt Through Time (2006)
 The Girl Who Played with Fire (2009)
 Girl, Interrupted (1999)
 Girl, Positive (2007) (TV)
 Girlfight (2000)
 Girlfriend: (2004, 2010 & 2018)
 The Girlfriend Experience (2009)
 Girlfriend From Hell (1989)
 Girlfriends: (1978, 2006 & 2009)
 Girlfriend’s Day (2017)
 Les Girls (1957)
 The Girls: (1961 & 1968)
 Girls Just Want to Have Fun (1985)
 Girls Lost (2015)
 Girls Nite Out (1982)
 The Girls of Pleasure Island (1953)
 Girls of the Sun (2018)
 Girls Town: (1959 & 1996)
 Girls Trip (2017)
 Girls und Panzer der Film (2015)
 Girls Will Be Girls (2003)
 Girls! Girls! Girls! (1962)
 Girls' Night Out (1998)
 Girls' School: (1938 & 1950)
 Girls' Town (1942)
 Giuseppe Makes a Movie (2014)
 Give a Girl a Break (1953)
 Give Me Liberty: (1936 & 2019)
 Give Seven Days (2014)
 The Giver (2014)
 Gjest Baardsen (1939)

Gl–Gn

 The Gladiator: (1938 & 1986)
 Gladiator: (1992 & 2000)
 The Gladiators (1969)
 Glago's Guest (2008)
 Glass: (1958 & 2019)
 The Glass Bottom Boat (1966)
 The Glass Castle: (1950 & 2017)
 The Glass House: (1972, 2001 & 2009)
 Glass House: The Good Mother (2006)
 Glass Houses: (1922 & 1972)
 The Glass Key (1935 & 1942)
 The Glass Menagerie: (1950, 1966 TV, 1973 TV & 1987)
 Glass Onion: A Knives Out Mystery (2022)
 The Glass Slipper (1955)
 The Glass Web (1953)
 Glasshouse (2021)
 Glassland (2014)
 Gleaming the Cube (1989)
 The Gleaners and I (2000)
 Glen or Glenda (1953)
 Glengarry Glen Ross (1992)
 The Glenn Miller Story (1954)
 The Glimmer Man (1996)
 A Glimpse Inside the Mind of Charles Swan III (2013)
 A Glitch in the Matrix (2021)
 Glitter (2001)
 A Global Affair (1964)
 Gloomy Sunday (1999)
 Gloria: (1980, 1999 American, 1999 Portuguese, 2013 & 2014)
 Glorifying the American Girl (1929)
 Glorious 39 (2009)
 Glorious Betsy (1928)
 Glory: (1956, 1989 & 2016)
 Glory Road (2006)
 Glow of the Firefly (2014)
 Gnanambika (1940)
 Gnome Alone (2017)
 A Gnome Named Gnorm (1990)
 The Gnome-Mobile (1967)
 Gnomeo & Juliet (2011)
 Gnomes (1980) (TV)
 Gnomes and Trolls: The Secret Chamber (2008)

Go

 Go: (1999, 2001 & 2007)
 Go Away from Me (2006)
 Go Figure (2005 TV)
 Go Gorilla Go (1975)
 Go Karts (2019)
 Go Man Go (1954)
 Go North (2017)
 Go West: (1925, 1940 & 2005)
 The Go-Between: (1971 & 2015 TV)

Goa-Goz

 Goal! series:
 Goal! The Dream Begins (2005)
 Goal! 2: Living the Dream... (2007)
 Goal III: Taking on the World (2009)
 The Goalkeeper's Fear of the Penalty (1972)
 The Goat: (1917, 1918 & 1921)
 Goat: (2015 & 2016)
 Goats (2012)
 Goblin (2010 TV)
 Gobs and Gals (1952)
 Gobseck (1924)
 God Bless America (2011)
 God Exists, Her Name Is Petrunija (2019)
 God Father: (2017 & 2020)
 God Forgives... I Don't! (1967)
 God of Gamblers (1989)
 God Grew Tired of Us (2006)
 God Made Them... I Kill Them (1968)
 God on My Side (2006)
 God Sleeps in Rwanda (2005)
 God Told Me To (1976)
 God of War (2017)
 The God Within (1912)
 God, Sex and Truth (2018)
 God's Angry Man (1980 TV)
 God's Army (2000)
 God's Clay: (1919 & 1928)
 God's Comedy (1995)
 God's Country: (1946, 1985, 2011 & 2022)
 God's Country and the Law (1921)
 God's Country and the Man (1937)
 God's Country and the Woman (1937)
 God's Crucible: (1917 & 1921)
 God's Doorkeeper: St. André of Montreal (2010 TV)
 God's Faithful Servant: Barla (2011)
 God's Gift (2006)
 God's Gift to Women (1931)
 God's Good Man (1919)
 God's Gun (1976)
 God's Inn by the Sea (1911)
 God's Lake Narrows (2011)
 God's Law and Man's (1917)
 God's Left Hand, Devil's Right Hand (2006)
 God's Little Acre (1958)
 God's Man (1917)
 God's Money (1959)
 God's Neighbors (2012)
 God's Nightmares (2019)
 God's Not Dead series:
 God's Not Dead (2014)
 God's Not Dead 2 (2016)
 God's Not Dead: A Light in Darkness (2018)
 God's Outlaw: (1919 & 1986)
 God's Own Country: (2014 & 2017)
 God's Pocket (2014)
 Godbeast Megazord: Return of Green Dragon (2016)
 Goddess (2013)
 The Goddess: (1934 & 1958)
 The Goddess of 1967 (2002)
 Goddess: How I fell in Love (2004)
 Godfather: (1991, 2007 & 2012)
 The Godfather series:
 The Godfather (1972)
 The Godfather Part II (1974)
 The Godfather Part III (1990)
 Godmonster of Indian Flats (1973)
 Godmother (1999)
 Gods of Egypt (2016)
 Gods and Generals (2003)
 Gods and Monsters (1998)
 The Gods Must Be Crazy (1980)
 The Gods Must Be Crazy II (1989)
 Godsend: (2004 & 2014)
 The Godson (1998)
 Godspell (1973)
 Godzilla series:
 Godzilla: (1954, 1998 & 2014)
 Godzilla Raids Again (1955)
 King Kong vs. Godzilla (1962)
 Mothra vs. Godzilla (1964)
 Ghidorah, the Three-Headed Monster (1964)
 Invasion of Astro-Monster (1965)
 Ebirah, Horror of the Deep (1966)
 Son of Godzilla (1967)
 Destroy All Monsters (1968)
 All Monsters Attack (1969)
 Godzilla vs. Hedorah (1971)
 Godzilla vs. Gigan (1972)
 Godzilla vs. Megalon (1973)
 Godzilla vs. Mechagodzilla (1974)
 Terror of Mechagodzilla (1975)
 The Return of Godzilla (1984)
 Godzilla 1985 (1985)
 Godzilla vs. Biollante (1989)
 Godzilla vs. King Ghidorah (1991)
 Godzilla vs. Mothra (1992)
 Godzilla vs. Mechagodzilla II (1993)
 Godzilla vs. SpaceGodzilla (1994)
 Godzilla vs. Destoroyah (1995)
 Godzilla 2000 (1999)
 Godzilla vs. Megaguirus (2000)
 Godzilla, Mothra and King Ghidorah: Giant Monsters All-Out Attack (2001)
 Godzilla Against Mechagodzilla (2002)
 Godzilla: Tokyo S.O.S. (2003)
 Godzilla: Final Wars (2004)
 Shin Godzilla (2016)
 Godzilla: Planet of the Monsters (2017)
 Godzilla: City on the Edge of Battle (2018)
 Godzilla: The Planet Eater (2018)
 Godzilla: King of the Monsters (2019)
 Godzilla vs. Kong (2021)
 Goemon (2009)
 Gog (1954)
 Gohatto (1999)
 Goin' Coconuts (1978)
 Goin' South (1978)
 Going Berserk (1983)
 Going Blind (2010)
 Going by the Book (2007)
 Going Clear (2015)
 Going the Distance: (2004 & 2010)
 Going Hollywood (1933)
 Going to the Mat (2004 TV)
 Going My Way (1944)
 Going Overboard (1989)
 Going to Pieces: The Rise and Fall of the Slasher Film (2006)
 Going Places: (1938 & 1974)
 Going in Style: (1979 & 2017)
 Going Upriver: The Long War of John Kerry (2004)
 Gokulamlo Seetha (1997)
 Gol Maal (1979)
 Gold Diggers series:
 Gold Diggers of Broadway (1929)
 Gold Diggers of '49 (1935)
 Gold Diggers of 1933 (1933)
 Gold Diggers of 1935 (1935)
 The Gold Rush (1925)
 Gold Rush Daze (1939)
 The Golden Age (2007)
 Golden Arm (2020)
 The Golden Bowl (2000)
 Golden Boy: (1925 & 1939)
 The Golden Boys (2008)
 Golden Brother (2014)
 The Golden Chance (1915)
 The Golden Child (1986)
 The Golden Coach (1953)
 The Golden Compass (2007)
 The Golden Doll (2016)
 Golden Earrings (1947)
 Golden Eighties (1986)
 Golden Girl (1951)
 The Golden Girls (1995)
 The Golden Lotus (1974)
 Golden Needles (1974)
 Golden Swallow (1968)
 The Golden Voyage of Sinbad (1974)
 Golden Yeggs (1950)
 GoldenEye (1995)
 Goldengirl (1979)
 The Goldfinch (2019)
 Goldfinger (1964)
 Goldie (1931)
 Goldwyn Follies (1938)
 The Golem: (1915 & 2018)
 Le Golem (1936)
 The Golem and the Dancing Girl (1917)
 The Golem: How He Came into the World (1920)
 Goliath Against the Giants (1961)
 Goliath Awaits (1981 TV)
 Goliath and the Barbarians (1959)
 Goliath at the Conquest of Damascus (1965)
 Goliath and the Dragon (1960)
 Goliath and the Rebel Slave (1963)
 Goliath and the Sins of Babylon (1963)
 Goliath and the Vampires (1961)
 Gomorrah (2008)
 Gone: (2007 & 2012)
 Gone in 60 Seconds: (1974 & 2000)
 Gone Are the Days (2018)
 Gone Baby Gone (2007)
 Gone to Earth (1950)
 Gone Fishin' (1997)
 Gone Girl (2014)
 Gone in the Night: (1996 TV & 2022)
 Gone Nutty (2002)
 Gone with the Pope (1976)
 Gone with the Wind (1939)
 Gonks Go Beat (1965)
 Good Advice (2001)
 The Good Boss (2021)
 Good Boy! (2003)
 Good Boys (2019)
 Good Burger (1997)
 Good Bye, Lenin! (2003)
 The Good Catholic (2017)
 A Good Day to Die Hard (2013)
 Good Deeds (2012)
 Good Dick (2008)
 The Good Dinosaur (2015)
 The Good Doctor: (1939 & 2011)
 The Good Earth (1937)
 The Good Father (1985)
 The Good German (2006)
 The Good Girl: (2002 & 2004)
 The Good Girls (2018)
 Good Guys Wear Black (1978)
 Good Hair (2009)
 A Good Lawyer's Wife (2003)
 The Good Liar (2019)
 The Good Lie (2014)
 The Good Life: (1996, 1997, 2007 & 2008)
 Good Luck Charlie, It's Christmas! (2011 TV)
 Good Luck Chuck (2007)
 Good Luck to You, Leo Grande (2022)
 Good Manners (2017)
 Good Men, Good Women (1995)
 Good Morning (1955)
 Good Morning (1959)
 Good Morning and... Goodbye! (1967)
 Good Morning, Babylon (1987)
 Good Morning, Boys (1937)
 Good Morning, Vietnam (1987)
 The Good Neighbor (2016)
 Good Neighbor Sam (1964)
 Good Neighbours (2010)
 Good News: (1930 & 1947)
 Good Night, and Good Luck (2005)
 The Good Nurse (2022)
 A Good Old Fashioned Orgy (2011)
 Good on Paper (2021)
 Good People (2014)
 Good Scouts (1938)
 The Good Shepherd (2006)
 The Good Son (1993)
 The Good Thief (2002)
 Good Time (2017)
 Good Times (1967)
 Good Will Hunting (1997)
 A Good Woman (2004)
 A Good Year (2006)
 The Good, the Bad and the Ugly (1966)
 The Good, the Bad, the Weird (2008)
 Goodbye Again: (1933 & 1961)
 Goodbye Casanova (2000 TV)
 Goodbye Christopher Robin (2017)
 The Goodbye Girl (1977)
 Goodbye Lover (1999)
 Goodbye South, Goodbye (1996)
 Goodbye Uncle Tom (1971)
 Goodbye Youth: (1918, 1927 & 1940)
 Goodbye, Columbus (1969)
 Goodbye, Dragon Inn (2003)
 Goodbye, Mr. Chips: (1939 & 1969)
 Goodfellas (1990)
 Goodnight Mister Tom (1998 TV)
 Goodnight Mommy (2014)
 The Goods: Live Hard, Sell Hard (2009)
 A Goofy Movie (1995)
 Goofy and Wilbur (1939)
 Goon (2011)
 The Goonies (1985)
 The Goose Steps Out (1942)
 Goosebumps (2015)
 Goosebumps 2: Haunted Halloween (2018)
 Goran (2016)
 The Gore Gore Girls (1972)
 Gorgeous (1999)
 Gorgo (1961)
 Gorillas in the Mist (1988)
 Gorky Park (1983)
 Gosford Park (2001)
 Gosnell: The Trial of America's Biggest Serial Killer (2018)
 The Gospel (2005)
 The Gospel According to St. Matthew (1964)
 The Gospel of John (2003)
 Gossip: (1923, 2000 American, 2000 Swedish & unreleased)
 Gotcha! (1985)
 Gothic (1986)
 Gothika (2003)
 Goto, Island of Love (1968)
 Gotta Kick It Up! (2002 TV)
 The Governess (1998)
 Goya's Ghosts (2006)
 Goyo: The Boy General (2018)
 Goyokin (1969)
 Gozu (2003)

Gr

Gra

 Grace: (2009 & 2014)
 Grace Is Gone (2008)
 Grace of Monaco (2014)
 Grace of My Heart (1996)
 Grace Quigley (1984)
 Gracie's Choice (2004)
 The Graduate (1967)
 The Graduates of Malibu High (1983)
 The Grail (1923)
 Grain (2017)
 Grain in Ear (2005)
 Gran Casino (1947)
 Gran Torino (2008)
 The Grand (2008)
 Grand Canyon: (1958 & 1991)
 Grand Canyon Adventure: River at Risk (2008)
 Grand Champion (2002)
 A Grand Day Out with Wallace and Gromit (1990)
 The Grand Duel (1972)
 Grand Hotel: (1927 & 1932)
 The Grand Budapest Hotel (2014)
 Grand Illusion (1937)
 Grand Prix: (1934, 1966 & 2010)
 Grand Slam: (1933, 1967 & 1978)
 Grand Theft Auto (1977)
 Grand Theft Parsons (2003)
 Le Grand Voyage (2004)
 Grand-Daddy Day Care (2019)
 Grande École (2004)
 La Grande Vadrouille (1966)
 Grandhotel (2006)
 Grandma: (1979 & 2015)
 Grandma's Boy: (1922 & 2006)
 The Grandmaster (2013)
 Grandmother’s House (1988)
 Grandview, U.S.A. (1984)
 The Grapes of Wrath (1940)
 Grass: (1925, 1999 & 2018)
 The Grass Is Greener (1960)
 Grass Roots (unreleased)
 Grasshopper (2015)
 The Grasshopper and the Ants (1934)
 Grassroots (2012)
 The Grave: (1996 & 2020)
 Grave Encounters (2011)
 Grave of the Fireflies (1988)
 Grave Robbers (1989)
 The Gravedancers (2008)
 Graveyard of Honor: (1975 & 2002)
 Graveyard Keeper's Daughter (2011)
 Graveyard Shift: (1987, 1990 & 2005)
 Gravity: (2009 & 2013)
 Gray Lady Down (1978)
 The Gray Man: (2007 & 2022)
 Gray Matters: (2006 & 2014)
 Gray's Anatomy (1996)
 Grayson (2004)

Gre

 Grease (1978)
 Grease 2 (1982)
 Grease Live! (2016)
 Greased Lightning (1977)
 The Great Adventures of Captain Kidd (1953)
 The Great Alibi (2008)
 The Great Alligator River (1979)
 The Great Alone (1922)
 Great Balls of Fire! (1989)
 The Great Beauty (2013)
 The Great Buck Howard (2009)
 The Great Buster: A Celebration (2018)
 The Great Caruso (1951)
 A Great Day in Harlem (1994)
 The Great Debaters (2007)
 The Great Detective (2017)
 The Great Dictator (1940)
 The Great Ecstasy of Robert Carmichael (2005)
 The Great Ecstasy of Woodcarver Steiner (1974)
 The Great Escape (1963)
 Great Expectations: (1917, 1934, 1946, 1974 TV, 1998, 1999 TV & 2012)
 Great Freedom (2021)
 The Great Gabbo (1929)
 The Great Game: (1930, 1953 & 2015)
 The Great Gatsby: (1926, 1949, 1974, 2000 TV & 2013)
 The Great Hack (2019)
 The Great Kidnapping (1973)
 The Great Lie (1941)
 The Great Love: (1918, 1925, 1931, 1942 & 1969)
 The Great Lover: (1920, 1931 & 1949)
 The Great Madcap (1949)
 The Great Man (1956)
 The Great Man's Whiskers (1972) (TV)
 The Great McGinty (1940)
 The Great Moment: (1921 & 1944)
 The Great Morgan (1946)
 The Great Mouse Detective (1986)
 The Great Muppet Caper (1981)
 The Great Mystical Circus (2018)
 The Great New Wonderful (2006)
 The Great Outdoors (1988)
 The Great Pretender (2018)
 The Great Race (1965)
 The Great Raid (2005)
 The Great Rupert (1950)
 The Great Santini (1979)
 The Great Silence (1968)
 The Great St. Trinian's Train Robbery (1966)
 The Great Train Robbery: (1903, 1941 & 1978)
 The Great Waldo Pepper (1975)
 The Great Wall (2016)
 The Great War: (1959, 2007 TV, 2017 & 2019)
 Great White: (1981 & 2021)
 The Great White Hope (1970)
 The Great White Hype (1996)
 The Great Yokai War (2005)
 The Great Yokai War: Guardians (2021)
 The Great Ziegfeld (1936)
 The Greatest: (1977 & 2009)
 The Greatest Beer Run Ever (2022)
 The Greatest Game Ever Played (2005)
 The Greatest Show on Earth (1952)
 The Greatest Showman (2017)
 The Greatest Story Ever Told (1965)
 Greed: (1924 & 2019)
 Greedy (1994)
 The Greek Tycoon (1978)
 The Green Berets (1968)
 Green Book (2018)
 Green Card (1990)
 Green Card Fever (2003)
 The Green Cockatoo (1937)
 Green for Danger (1946)
 Green Dolphin Street (1947)
 Green Fire (1954)
 Green Fish (1997)
 The Green Goddess: (1923 & 1930)
 Green Grass of Wyoming (1948)
 The Green Hornet: (1940, 1994, 2006 & 2011)
 The Green Hornet Strikes Again! (1941)
 Green Ice (1981)
 The Green Inferno (2013)
 The Green Knight (2021)
 Green Lantern series:
 Green Lantern: First Flight (2009)
 Green Lantern: Emerald Knights (2011)
 Green Lantern (2011)
 Green Mansions (1959)
 The Green Mile (1999)
 The Green Ray (1986)
 Green Room (2016)
 The Green Slime (1969)
 Green Snake (1993)
 Green Street Hooligans (2005)
 Green Tea (2003)
 The Green Years (1946)
 Green Zone (2010)
 Greenberg (2010)
 Greener Grass (2019)
 Greenfingers (2000)
 Greenland (2020)
 Greetings (1968)
 Greetings from Tim Buckley (2012)
 Gregory's Girl (1981)
 Gregory's Two Girls (1999)
 Gremlins (1984)
 Gremlins 2: The New Batch (1990)
 Grendel Grendel Grendel (1981)
 Greta (2018)
 Gretel & Hansel (2020)
 The Grey (2012)
 The Grey Fox (1982)
 Grey Gardens: (1975 & 2009 TV)
 Grey Matter (2011)
 Grey Owl (1999)
 The Grey Zone (2001)
 Greyhound (2020)
 Greystoke - The Legend of Tarzan, Lord of the Apes (1984)

Gri-Gry

 Gribiche (1926)
 Gribouille (1937)
 Gridiron Flash (1934)
 Gridiron Gang: (1993 & 2006)
 Gridlock'd (1997)
 Gridlocked (2015)
 Il Grido (1957)
 Grierson (1973)
 Grievous Bodily Harm (1988)
 Griff the Invisible (2010)
 Griffin & Phoenix (2006)
 Griffin and Phoenix (1976)
 The Grifters (1990)
 Grill Point (2002)
 Grilled (2006)
 The Grim Game (1919)
 Grim Reaper (2007)
 Grimm (2003)
 Grimsby (2016)
 The Grinch (2018)
 Grind: (1997 & 2003)
 The Grind: (1915)
 Grindhouse (2007)
 Gringo (2018)
 El Gringo (2012)
 The Grinning Face (1921)
 The Grissom Gang (1971)
 Grizzly (1976)
 Grizzly II: Revenge (2020)
 Grizzly Man (2005)
 Groom Lake (2002)
 The Groomsmen (2006)
 Groove (2000)
 The Groove Tube (1974)
 Gross Anatomy (1989)
 Grosse Pointe Blank (1997)
 Grotesque (2009)
 Groundhog Day (1993)
 The Group (1966)
 The Grow (2012)
 The Grow 2 (2015)
 Grown Ups (2010)
 Grown Ups 2 (2013)
 Growth of the Soil (1921)
 The Grudge series:
 The Grudge: (2004 & 2020)
 The Grudge 2 (2006)
 The Grudge 3 (2008)
 Grudge Match (2013)
 The Gruffalo (2009) (TV)
 The Gruffalo's Child (2011) (TV)
 Grumpier Old Men (1995)
 Grumpy Old Men (1993)
 Gryphon (2007) (TV)

Gu–Gy

 The Gua Sha Treatment (2001)
 Guadalcanal Diary (1943)
 The Guard: (1990, 2001 & 2011)
 The Guard from Underground (1992)
 The Guardian: (1990 & 2006)
 Guardians of the Galaxy series:
 Guardians of the Galaxy (2014)
 Guardians of the Galaxy Vol. 2 (2017)
 The Guardians of the Galaxy Holiday Special (2022)
 Guardians of the Galaxy Vol. 3 (2023)
 Guarding Tess (1994)
 The Guatemalan Handshake (2006)
 Guddi: (1961 & 1971)
 The Guerrilla: (1908 & 1973)
 Guerrilla: (1985 & 2011)
 Guess Who (2005)
 Guess Who's Coming to Dinner (1967)
 Guest: (2019 & 2020)
 The Guest: (2014 American, 2014 Chilean & 2017)
 Guest Artist (2019)
 Guest from the Future (1985 TV)
 Guest of Honour: (1934 & 2019)
 Guest House: (1980 & 2020)
 Guest House Paradiso (1999)
 The Guest Room (2021)
 A Guide for the Married Man (1967)
 A Guide to Recognizing Your Saints (2006)
 The Guilt Trip (2012)
 Guilty: (1916, 1928, 1953, 2011 & 2020)
 The Guilty: (1947, 1975, 2000, 2018 & 2021)
 Guilty Bystander (1950)
 Guilty of Romance (2011)
 Guilty as Sin (1993)
 Guilty by Suspicion (1991)
 Guilty?: (1930 & 1951)
 Guimoon: The Lightless Door (2021)
 The Guinea Pig (1948)
 Guinea Pig series:
 Guinea Pig: Devil's Experiment (1985)
 Guinea Pig 2: Flower of Flesh and Blood (1985)
 Guinevere: (1994 TV & 1999)
 The Gulf Between (1917)
 Gulliver Mickey (1934)
 Gulliver's Travels: (1924, 1939, 1977, 1996 TV & 2010)
 Gully (2019)
 The Gumball Rally (1976)
 Gumby: The Movie (1995)
 Gummo (1997)
 Gumshoe (1972)
 Gun Crazy (1950)
 Gun Crazy: A Woman from Nowhere (2002)
 Gun Shy: (2000 & 2017)
 Gun Woman (2014)
 Guncrazy (1992)
 Gunfight in Abilene (1967)
 Gunfight at the O.K. Corral (1957)
 The Gunfighter (1950)
 A Gunfighter's Pledge (2008) (TV)
 Gung Ho (1986)
 Gunga Din (1939)
 Gunjan Saxena: The Kargil Girl (2020)
 The Gunman: (1952 & 2015)
 Gunman (1983)
 Gunman in the Streets (1950)
 Gunpowder Milkshake (2021)
 Gunpowder, Treason & Plot (2004) (TV)
 Guns of El Chupacabra (1997)
 Guns and Guitars (1936)
 Guns for Hire (2015)
 The Guns of Navarone (1961)
 Guns for San Sebastian (1968)
 Gupt: The Hidden Truth (1997)
 The Guru: (1969 & 2002)
 Guru: (1980, 1989, 1997, 2007, 2012, 2016 & 2017)
 Gustave (2007)
 A Guy Named Joe (1943)
 A Guy Thing (2003)
 Guyana: Crime of the Century (1979)
 Guyana Tragedy: The Story of Jim Jones (1980) (TV)
 Guys and Dolls (1955)
 The Guyver (1991)
 Guyver: Dark Hero (1994)
 Guzaarish: (2010 & 2015)
 Gwen (2018)
 Gymkata (1985)
 Gypsy: (1937, 1962, 1993 TV, 2011 & 2020)
 Gypsy 83 (2001)
 Gypsy Blood: (1920 & 1934)
 Gypsy Melody (1936)
 The Gypsy Moths (1969)
 Gypsy Wildcat (1944)

Previous:  List of films: F    Next:  List of films: H

See also

 Lists of films
 Lists of actors
 List of film and television directors
 List of documentary films
 List of film production companies

-